In linear algebra, a cone—sometimes called a linear cone for distinguishing it from other sorts of cones—is a subset of a vector space that is closed under scalar multiplication; that is,  is a cone if  implies  for every .

When the scalars are real numbers, or belong to an ordered field, one generally calls a cone a subset of a vector space that is closed under multiplication by a positive scalar. In this context, a convex cone is a cone that is closed under addition, or, equivalently, a subset of a vector space that is closed under linear combinations with positive coefficients. It follows that convex cones are convex sets.

In this article, only the case of scalars in an ordered field is considered.

Definition 

A subset C of a vector space V over an ordered field F is a cone (or sometimes called a linear cone) if for each x in C and positive scalar α in F, the product αx is in C. Note that some authors define cone with the scalar α ranging over all non-negative scalars (rather than all positive scalars, which does not include 0).

A cone C is a convex cone if  belongs to C, for any positive scalars α, β, and any x, y in C. 
A cone C is convex if and only if C + C ⊆ C.

This concept is meaningful for any vector space that allows the concept of "positive" scalar, such as spaces over the rational, algebraic, or (more commonly) the real numbers. Also note that the scalars in the definition are positive meaning that the origin does not have to belong to C. Some authors use a definition that ensures the origin belongs to C. Because of the scaling parameters α and β, cones are infinite in extent and not bounded.

If C is a convex cone, then for any positive scalar α and any x in C the vector  It follows that a convex cone C is a special case of a linear cone.

It follows from the above property that a convex cone can also be defined as a linear cone that is closed under convex combinations, or just under additions.

Examples 

 For a vector space V, the empty set, the space V, and any linear subspace of V are convex cones.
 The tangent cones of a convex set are convex cones.
 The set  is a cone but not a convex cone.
 The norm cone   is a convex cone. 
 The intersection of two convex cones in the same vector space is again a convex cone, but their union may fail to be one.
 The class of convex cones is also closed under arbitrary linear maps.
 The set of positive semidefinite matrices.
 The set of nonnegative continuous functions is a convex cone.

Special examples

Affine convex cones 
An affine convex cone is the set resulting from applying an affine transformation to a convex cone. A common example is translating a convex cone by a point . Technically, such transformations can produce non-cones. For example, unless ,  is not a linear cone. However, it is still called an affine convex cone.

Half-spaces 

Half-spaces (open or closed) are affine convex cones. Moreover (in finite dimensions), any convex cone C that is not the whole space V must be contained in some closed half-space H of V; this is a special case of Farkas' lemma.

Polyhedral and finitely generated cones 

Polyhedral cones are special kinds of cones that can be defined in several ways:

 A cone C is polyhedral if it is the conic combination of finitely many vectors (this property is also called finitely-generated). I.e., there is a set of vectors   so that  . 
 A cone is polyhedral if it is the intersection of a finite number of half-spaces which have 0 on their boundary (this was proved by Weyl in 1935).
 A cone C is polyhedral if there is some matrix  such that .
 A cone is polyhedral if it is the solution set of a system of homogeneous linear inequalities. Algebraically, each inequality is defined by a row of the matrix A. Geometrically, each inequality defines a halfspace that passes through the origin.

Every finitely generated cone is a polyhedral cone, and every polyhedral cone is a finitely generated cone.  Every polyhedral cone has a unique representation as a conical hull of its extremal generators, and a unique representation of intersections of halfspaces, given each linear form associated with the halfspaces also define a support hyperplane of a facet.

Polyhedral cones play a central role in the representation theory of polyhedra. For instance, the decomposition theorem for polyhedra states that every polyhedron can be written as the Minkowski sum of a convex polytope and a polyhedral cone. Polyhedral cones also play an important part in proving the related Finite Basis Theorem for polytopes which shows that every polytope is a polyhedron and every bounded polyhedron is a polytope.

The two representations of a polyhedral cone - by inequalities and by vectors - may have very different sizes. For example, consider the cone of all non-negative n-by-n matrices with equal row and column sums. The inequality representation requires n2 inequalities and  equations, but the vector representation requires n! vectors (see the Birkhoff-von Neumann Theorem). The opposite can also happen - the number of vectors may be polynomial while the number of inequalities is exponential.

The two representations together provide an efficient way to decide whether a given vector is in the cone: to show that it is in the cone, it is sufficient to present it as a conic combination of the defining vectors; to show that it is not in the cone, it is sufficient to present a single defining inequality that it violates. This fact is known as Farkas' lemma.

A subtle point in the representation by vectors is that the number of vectors may be exponential in the dimension, so the proof that a vector is in the cone might be exponentially long. Fortunately, Carathéodory's theorem guarantees that every vector in the cone can be represented by at most d defining vectors, where d is the dimension of the space.

Blunt, pointed, flat, salient, and proper cones 

According to the above definition, if C is a convex cone, then C ∪ {0} is a convex cone, too. A convex cone is said to be  if 0 is in C, and  if 0 is not in C. Blunt cones can be excluded from the definition of convex cone by substituting "non-negative" for "positive" in the condition of α, β.

A cone is called flat if it contains some nonzero vector x and its opposite −x, meaning C contains a linear subspace of dimension at least one, and salient otherwise. 
A blunt convex cone is necessarily salient, but the converse is not necessarily true. 
A convex cone C is salient if and only if C ∩ −C ⊆ {0}. 
A cone C is said to be generating if  equals the whole vector space.

Some authors require salient cones to be pointed. 
The term "pointed" is also often used to refer to a closed cone that contains no complete line (i.e., no nontrivial subspace of the ambient vector space V, or what is called a salient cone). 
The term proper (convex) cone is variously defined, depending on the context and author. It often means a cone that satisfies other properties like being convex, closed, pointed, salient, and full-dimensional. Because of these varying definitions, the context or source should be consulted for the definition of these terms.

Rational cones 
A type of cone of particular interest to pure mathematicians is the partially ordered set of rational cones. "Rational cones are important objects in toric algebraic geometry, combinatorial commutative algebra, geometric combinatorics, integer programming.". This object arises when we study cones in  together with the lattice . A  cone is called rational (here we assume "pointed", as defined above) whenever its generators all have integer coordinates, i.e., if  is a rational cone, then .

Dual cone

Let C ⊂ V be a set, not necessary a convex set, in a real vector space V equipped with an inner product. The (continuous or topological) dual cone to C is the set

which is always a convex cone. Here,  is the duality pairing between C and V, i.e. .

More generally, the (algebraic) dual cone to C ⊂ V in a linear space V is a subset of the dual space V* defined by:

In other words, if V* is the algebraic dual space of V, it is the set of linear functionals that are nonnegative on the primal cone C. If we take V* to be the continuous dual space then it is the set of continuous linear functionals nonnegative on C. This notion does not require the specification of an inner product on V.

In finite dimensions, the two notions of dual cone are essentially the same because every finite dimensional linear functional is continuous, and every continuous linear functional in an inner product space induces a linear isomorphism (nonsingular linear map) from V* to V, and this isomorphism will take the dual cone given by the second definition, in V*, onto the one given by the first definition; see the Riesz representation theorem.

If C is equal to its dual cone, then C is called self-dual. A cone can be said to be self-dual without reference to any given inner product, if there exists an inner product with respect to which it is equal to its dual by the first definition.

Constructions 
 Given a closed, convex subset K of Hilbert space V, the  outward normal cone to the set K at the point x in K is given by
 
 Given a closed, convex subset K of V, the tangent cone (or contingent cone) to the set K at the point x is given by
 
 Given a closed, convex subset K of Hilbert space V, the tangent cone to the set K at the point x in K can be defined as polar cone to outwards normal cone :
 
 
Both the normal and tangent cone have the property of being closed and convex.

They are important concepts in the fields of convex optimization, variational inequalities and projected dynamical systems.

Properties 

If C is a non-empty convex cone in X, then the linear span of C is equal to C - C and the largest vector subspace of X contained in C is equal to C ∩ (−C).

Partial order defined by a convex cone
A pointed and salient convex cone C induces a partial ordering "≤" on V, defined so that  if and only if  (If the cone is flat, the same definition gives merely a preorder.) Sums and positive scalar multiples of valid inequalities with respect to this order remain valid inequalities. A vector space with such an order is called an ordered vector space. Examples include the product order on real-valued vectors,  and the Loewner order on positive semidefinite matrices. Such an ordering is commonly found in positive semidefinite programming.

See also 

 Cone (disambiguation)
 Cone (geometry)
 Cone (topology)
 Farkas' lemma
 Bipolar theorem
 Linear combination
 Ordered vector space

Notes

References

 
  
 
  
  
 

Convex analysis
Convex geometry
Geometric shapes
Linear algebra